Innsbrook is a census-designated place in Henrico County, Virginia, United States. The population as of the 2010 Census was 7,753.

Innsbrook is a mixed-use corporate center in Central Virginia that was founded in 1979 by local developer  Sidney Gunst on property owned by David Arenstein and Henry Stern. Located approximately 13 miles northwest of Richmond’s central business district at the confluence of I-64 and I-295, the development is the region’s second largest employment center. Currently it encompasses over seven million square feet of office space, representing over 400 companies and 22,000 employees. The development includes approximately 1000 residential units and 100,000 sq ft of retail and 12 hotels.

Governance 
The Innsbrook Owners Association (IOA) and its board of directors, is a non-profit corporation that upholds a comprehensive set of restrictive covenants that were established to preserve the quality and character of the development. The IOA actively oversees issues such as security, landscaping, lakes, trails, and stormwater management, and coordinates with the county on roads and utilities. The IOA Architectural Review Committee exercises oversight and approval of design plans prior to submission to the county in accordance with Innsbrook’s design guidelines.

Disambiguation
Prior to the development of Innsbrook in 1979, the rural crossroads of West Broad Street (Highway 250) and Cox Road was a Populated Place (unincorporated area) historically known as Erin Shades (GNIS FID: 1760166) within the 23060 zip code. While Erin Shades no longer exists, numerous geographical information systems (GIS) retain this crossroad reference, including the 1997 USGS map.

History of Corporate Presence 

 Electronic Data Systems (EDS) plans center at Innsbrook (1989)
 The Computer Co. relocated headquarters to Innsbrook (1989)
 US Sprint puts 500-employee service center in Innsbrook (1989)
 Two firms, MassMutual and Rowe Development Co., move offices to Innsbrook, expand (1989)
 Development companies buy 50 acre technology park property at Innsbrook (1989)
 Aetna Life and Causality Co. relocates divisions to Innsbrook (1989)

References

Census-designated places in Henrico County, Virginia
Census-designated places in Virginia